Patrick Dele-Cole (born 1940) is a Nigerian politician, journalist and diplomat who in 1976 became the managing director of the Daily Times. He was also a presidential candidate of the Social Democratic Party in the early 1990s and was Nigeria's ambassador to Argentina and Brazil.

He is author of the book Modern Traditional Elites in the Politics of Lagos.

Life 
He attended the University of Otago, New Zealand where he earned a first class honours degree. He also studied at Cambridge University.

As a managing director of the Daily Times in 1976 he restored the paper's former influence to become one of Africa's largest at that time and brought in influential journalists, including Dele Giwa and Dr. Stanley Macebuh.

References 

Living people
Date of birth missing (living people)
1940 births
University of Otago alumni
Alumni of the University of Cambridge